The 1998 PruTour was the first edition of the Prudential Tour of Britain cycle race and was held from 23 May to 31 May 1998. The race started in Stirling and finished in London. The race was won by Stuart O'Grady of the  team.

Route

Teams
Eighteen teams of six riders started the race:

 
 
 
 
 Oilme
 Team Brite Voice
 
 Great Britain
 England
 Scotland
 Wales
 Ireland
 Denmark
 New Zealand
 Netherlands
 Australia
 South Africa

General classification

Notes

References

1998
Tour of Britain
Tour of Britain
May 1998 sports events in the United Kingdom